The women's 4x100 metres relay at the 2012 IPC Athletics European Championships was held at the Stadskanaal Stadium from 24–29 June.

Medalists
Results given by IPC Athletics.

Results
Final

See also
List of IPC world records in athletics

References

4x100 metres relay, women
2012 in women's athletics